Carroll Publishing Company is a 501(c)(3) corporation owned by the Roman Catholic Archdiocese of Washington (D.C.) and tasked with publishing the two official weekly newspapers of the archdiocese, the Catholic Standard and, in Spanish, El Pregonero.

History
The company was formed and incorporated in 1954, three years after the Catholic Standard was first published. Under the direction of the late Cardinal James A. Hickey, archbishop of Washington, Carroll assumed control of El Pregonero in 1985, eight years after it was first published by the archdiocese's Spanish Catholic Center.

The company is controlled by a corporate board of directors chaired by the archbishop of Washington, currently the Most Rev. Donald W. Wuerl. A separate advisory board of directors provides strategic and operational advice. The company president, Thomas H. Schmidt, joined the firm in 1991. Company vice presidents are the two newspaper editors, the Catholic Standard's Mark V. Zimmermann and El Pregonero's Rafael Roncal.

In addition to its two weekly newspapers, the company also publishes a four-page newspaper for Catholic elementary school children, called Junior Saints, which is issued monthly throughout the school year. The newspapers' first websites appeared in 1998. Online editions were overhauled in 2007.

References

External links
http://www.cathstan.org
http://www.elpreg.org
http://www.adw.org

Roman Catholic Archdiocese of Washington
Catholic newspapers
Publishing companies established in 1954
1954 establishments in Washington, D.C.